Honest Cowboy is the first extended play (EP) by American hip hop recording artist Stalley.
It was released on September 17, 2013, under Maybach Music Group and Atlantic.

Background
Stalley released his first single "Swangin" featuring hip hop legend Scarface from his Honest Cowboy, was released on March 26, 2013. The music video was released on July 9, 2013 and featured a cameo from Paul Wall. Following the mixtape's August 8, 2013 release it was met with generally positive reviews from critics such as PopMatters. Shortly after it was revealed it received a nomination at the 2013 BET Hip Hop Awards in the "Best Mixtape Category". After receiving a great response from his label he released Honest Cowboy: EP to iTunes on September 17, 2013, the same day as the release of Self Made Vol. 3.

Track listing

 (co.) denotes co-producer

Notes
"Swangin" contains a samples of "U Send Me Swingin'" by Mint Condition and G-Side's "Swangin", featuring Darrien and The Speed of Sound Choir.

Chart positions

Release history

References 

2013 debut EPs
Maybach Music Group albums
Albums produced by DJ Quik
Albums produced by Terrace Martin